House of Fame, also known as House of Fame – La Academia, is a Greek talent and reality show based on the Mexican concept La Academia. It began airing on February 15, 2021 on Skai TV. Singer Eleni Foureira hosted the live concerts on Fridays. The four judges were the founder of the record company Panik Records Giorgos Arsenakos, singer Katy Garbi, songwriter Phoebus and singer Yannis Ploutarchos.

Production
In 2020, Skai TV announced a new talent show and reality show, a same format like the show Fame Story, that used to air from 2002 until 2006 on ANT1. The show was confirmed for its first season to begin in 2020–2021 television season, with a trailer along with the renewals of The Voice of Greece, Big Brother and Survivor.

Scheduling
After speculation in November 2020, the show was expected to start in early 2021. The show's air date was officially confirmed on February 3, 2021 with a trailer. Every Friday opposite of the live concerts of House of Fame, will broadcast the seventh season of MasterChef Greece on Star Channel and I Farma returning after 16 years in the Greek Television ANT1. House of Fame will broadcast also in Cyprus on Sigma TV.

Broadcasting
The show began airing with the daily episodes, on February 15, 2021 and the first live concert will begin on February 26, 2021.

The daily episodes, where are seen what the contestants are doing in the academy, will broadcast from Monday to Friday at 06:00pm until 07:40pm. The first daily episode, on February 15, 2021, was broadcast at 05:15pm until 07:50pm.

The live concerts, where the contestants are singing the song that have learned the week and also one of them will leave the show, will broadcast live every Friday at 09:00pm until at 01:00am.

Filming
The Academy was located in Koropi, Attica. The house is the same house was used in the sixth season of Big Brother, but differently shaped. It's a state-of-the-art space of 700 m2 with a 12-meter pool. In the house, there are 56 cameras and 50 microphones installed. The students entered the academy on February 13, 2021 and the next day began the lessons.

Format
The most fun music Academy welcomes eighteen talented singers from Greece and Cyprus. For the next few months, the students become roommates in the same house where all the spaces are shared. Students will follow a strict curriculum from early morning until the afternoon while as in any Academy, unjustified absences are prohibited. Vocals, dance, exercise and costume design are just a few of the courses that will be taught on a daily basis. Additional seminars, meetings and surprise collaborations with renowned singers are in the program of the Academy. Cameras and microphones record their daily life 24 hours a day, 7 days a week with the most important moments being shown daily in the afternoon.

In the lives of the show, Eleni Foureira welcomes the students of the Academy on the stage of House of Fame – La Academia for the most critical concert of their lives. Students present the song they prepared the week before. The judges and the TV audience will decide on the future of the students at the top music academy. At the end of the live concert the judges will select the three contestants to be nominated for eviction for the next live, while viewers will have a week to vote for the singer they want to stay on the House of Fame.

Cast

Host
 Eleni Foureira

Judges
 Giorgos Arsenakos
 Katy Garbi
 Phoebus
 Yannis Ploutarchos

Teachers
 Panos Metaxopoulos – Director of the Academy
 Penny Baltatzi – Responsible for vocals
 Chali Jennings – Choreographer
 Al Giga – Style Expert
 Dora Panteli – Health & Wellness Coach

Guest star
 Stan (episode 2)
 Katerina Stanisi (episode 15)
 Bo (episode 22)
 Angela Dimitriou (episode 27)
 Panos Kalidis (episode 37)
 Evi Droutsa (episodes 43 & 46)
 Ilias Vrettos (episode 49)
 Demy (episode 56)
 Josephine (episode 57 & 73)
 Dionysis Schoinas (episode 58)
 Harry Varthakouris (episode 61)
 Athena Manoukian (episode 62)
 Ioanna Maleskou (episode 63)
 Eleni Peta (episode 64)
 Akis Diximos (episode 64, 66–67, 72, 78–79 & 82)
 Elena Tsagrinou (episode 66)
 Kalomira (episode 70)
 Constantina (episode 77)
 Lefteris Kintatos (episode 77)
 Giorgos Lempesis (episode 78)
 Dimos Anastasiadis (episode 79)

Students
On February 13, 2021, Skai TV announced the 17 students, who entered on the first week. On the fourth week, two new students, Elena Domazou and Minas Tsoukanis entered the academy.

Live Concerts
The live concerts began airing on February 26, 2021. In every live concert, the contestants are assigned a popular song to perform in a duet or solo. Before the live concerts, the Academy's Teachers chooses the student of the week. This student has immunity for the next live concert. In the live concerts, the jury panel comments and rate from 1 to 10 on the performances and nominates three students for elimination. Before the live concert, the students nominates one of the student and at the end the student with the most votes, will be deducted 4 points from the judges' rates. Throughout the week, the television audience decides which of the three prospective students must leave the Academy. Since the live concert 2, the total points from the bottom five/six from the judge's scores are shown. Since the fifth concert, the Director of the Academy, Panos Metaxopoulos, can save one of the three contestants that they are up for elimination. Then the contestant that was in the bottom four of the judge's scores, was up for elimination. Metaxopoulos can save only 3 times until the end of the show.

Results summary
Colour key

Live Concert details

Live Concert 1 (February 26)
 Group performance: Alex, Aris, George, Giannis, Koni, Marianna, Obi, Venia – "Survivor"/"Den Me Afora"/"Mazi sou"/"Eleges"/"Dokimase Me"

Live Concert 2 (March 5)

Judge's scores

Live Concert 3 (March 12)

Judge's scores

Live Concert 4 (March 19)

Judge's scores

Live Concert 5 (March 26)

Judge's scores

Live Concert 6 (April 2)

Judge's scores

Live Concert 7 (April 9)

Judge's scores

Live Concert 8 (April 16)
 Group performance: Aris, Chryssa, George, Koni, Stefanos, Venia – "Ela mou"/"Opou kai na sai"/"Ena"/"(I've Had) The Time of My Life"/"Iparhi Zoi"
 Group Performance: Elena D., Giannis, Giorgos, Jimmy, Marianna, Minas, Penelope – "Tainia Fadasias"/"Opou kai na Pao"/"To Koritsi"/"To Fili tis Zois"/"Hot n Cold"

Judge's scores

Live Concert 9 (April 23)
 Musical guest: Dionysis Schoinas – "To Parti mas"/"15 Eti Fotos"/"To Kalokairi"/"Omorfainis tin Zoi mou"/"Sygkoinonounta docheia"/"Xipnisa Kapos"/"Mykonos"/"Apomimisi Agapis"/"Ti trela mou Zitas"/"Eimai akoma paidi"/"Sti Diskotek"/"Akros Tolmiro"/"Taram Taram"/"Pote"

Judge's scores

Live Concert 10 (May 7)
 The show aired on May 7 because of the Easter holidays.
 Duet performances:
 Aris & Venia – "Adikrista"
 Marianna & Stefanos – "Push Ups"
 Jimmy & Penelope – "Ola ayta pou Fovamai"/"How You Remind Me"
 George & Giorgos – "Didimotiho Blues"
 Elena D. & Giannis – "Adiaforos"

Live Concert 11 (May 14)
 Musical guest: Josephine – "Paliopaido"/"Ti"/"Magia"/"To Gucci Forema"/"We Will Rock You"/"I Love Rock 'n' Roll"/"Lathos mou"/"Oti Oneirevomoun"/"Ego"

Live Concert 12 (May 21)
 Musical guest: Dimos Anastasiadis – "Tora Milao Ego"/"Mi Hanomaste"/"Taseis Katastrofis (Kovo ti Nychta sta Dyo)"/"Antitheti Trochia"/"Me sena Plai mou"/"Chtise mia Gefyra"/"An M Agapas"/"Esy"

Live Final (May 28)
 Opening performance: Eleni Foureira – "Yayo"/"Reggaeton"/"Ti Koitas"/"El Ritmo Psicodélico"/"Tranquila"/"Loquita"/"Montero (Call Me by Your Name)"/"Pio Erotas Pethaineis"/"Sto Theo Me Paei"/"Mporei"/"Caramela"/"Seven Nation Army"/"Dokimase Me"/"Light It Up"/"Levitating"/"Rhythm Nation"/"Fuego"
 Musical performance: Panos Metaxopoulos – "Se poio Syneffo koimatai to Fegkari"
 Group performance: All contestants – "Havana"/"Ola Kala"/"La Isla Bonita"/"Me sena Plai mou"/"Misirlou"/"Min Argeis"/"Pano ap Ola"/"Just Dance"/"Paradothika se Sena"/"I Got You (I Feel Good)"/"Ego"/"Akrogialies Dilina"

Ratings
Official ratings are taken from AGB Hellas.

References

External links
 Official website on skaitv.gr

Skai TV original programming
2020s Greek television series
2021 Greek television series debuts
2021 Greek television seasons
Greek-language television shows
Television shows set in Greece